The Attack were an English freakbeat/psychedelic rock band formed in 1966 around singer Richard Shirman (26 April 1949, London – 26 July 2017). The first line-up featured drummer Alan Whitehead from Marmalade, guitarist and trumpeter David O'List (later of The Nice) - later replaced by John Du Cann (later of Andromeda and Atomic Rooster), Richard Shirman on vocals, Bob Hodges on piano and organ and finally Gerry Henderson on bass. Their first single "Try It" had also been recorded by The Standells and Ohio Express. They also released a version of "Hi Ho Silver Lining", a few days earlier than Jeff Beck. Richard Shirman was invited to be singer with Andromeda but he declined.

In 1979, Shirman reunited The Attack. Two years later he founded another band Hershey and the 12 Bars who released an album in 2000: Greatest Hits Volume II (A New Day Records, AND CD43).

Discography

Singles 
 "Try It" b/w "We Don't Know" (Decca) 1967
 "Hi Ho Silver Lining" b/w "Any More Than I Do" (Decca) 1967 – UK #53
 "Created By Clive" b/w "Colour of My Mind" (Decca) 1967
 "Neville Thumbcatch" b/w "Lady Orange Peel" (Decca) 1968
 "Hi Ho Silver Lining" b/w "Any More Than I Do" [Reissue] (Decca) 1972
 "Created By Clive" b/w "Colour of My Mind" [Reissue] (Acme) 2005

Compilation albums 
 Magic in the Air (Reflection) 1990
 Magic in the Air [Reissue] (Aftermath) 1992
 Complete Recordings 1967-68 (Acme) 1999
 Final Daze (Angel Air) 2001
 About Time! (RPM, Bam-Caruso) 2006

References

External links
Marmalade Skies: The Attack bio
A New Day Records
Richard Shirman interview

Musical groups established in 1966
Musical groups from London
English psychedelic rock music groups
English pop music groups
1966 establishments in England